Kenneth Branagan (27 July 1930 – 9 August 2008) was an English football fullback who was born in Salford. He played for Manchester City F.C. between 1950 and 1959, appearing 197 times and scoring three goals before being transferred to Oldham Athletic A.F.C. Ken and wife Maureen had seven children, 3 sons (Sean Branagan, Mike Branagan & Jim Branagan) and 4 daughters (Moi Branagan, Joanne Branagan, Christina Green and Trisha Ferguson). Ken died on the night of Saturday 9 August 2008 at the age of 78 after a long battle with Alzheimer's disease.

Footballers from Salford
Manchester City F.C. players
1930 births
2008 deaths
Association football midfielders
English footballers